Faadu is an Indian Hindi language romance-drama web series, directed by Ashwiny Iyer Tiwari and produced by StudioNext. It is written by Saumya Joshi and is based on the journey of a man rising from poverty to lead an extraordinary life, while tackling many questions that life throws at him. The show stars Pavail Gulati and Saiyami Kher.

The show is now streaming exclusively on SonyLIV.

Cast
 Pavail Gulati as Abhay, Manjiri's husband
 Saiyami Kher as Manjiri, Abhay's wife
 Abhilash Thapliyal
 Gunjan Joshi
 Daya Shankar Pandey
 Ajay Raju as Chawl Boy

Summary

Faadu is a story of a man belonging to progressive India who lies in the middle of choices that need validation. He is stuck between the fabric of economic upgrade and true love. Abhay is an angry poet and dreamer who aspires to be the hero of his rags-to-riches story, in no time. In this ambitious journey of need and greed, he falls in love with Manjiri, a poetess with a different life philosophy. In an era of people running behind their ambitious selves, will Abhay choose love and simplicity or lean towards money and complexity? Faadu attempts to answer this very quest of mankind - ‘It does not matter where you are born. Your destiny lies in your hands.’ But what if our self-written destiny goes completely wrong and you want to return to where it all started?

Episodic Synopsis

Reception

Firstpost opines Faadu as a brilliant study of love, poetry, ambition, and more, with Pavail and Saiyami being beyond brilliant in their roles. Director Ashwini Iyer Tiwari is receiving applauds for her "artful creation", and Saumya Joshi for his “exceptionally evocative” writing. The music of the show as well as the supporting cast have gathered special mentions and rightly so.

Scroll acclaims the show as a clutter-breaker and calls it “a soaring tale of vaulting ambition". It lauds the direction of Ashwini Iyer Tiwari against the beautifully captured landscape and a "true-to-meter" script by Saumya Joshi, with exceptional performances by the leads and a few noticeable characters.

The show has received a 4-star rating from DNA, and acclamations have poured in for director Ashwini Iyer Tiwari for the “honesty and conviction” -  the series reflects. Every character leaves an impact in this "thought-provoking and touching" love story.

References

External links
 
 Faadu Official Website

Drama web series
2022 Indian television series endings
Indian drama web series
Hindi-language web series